Mount Merrion F.C. is an amateur association football club based in Mount Merrion, Dublin, Ireland. The club plays in the Leinster Senior League. Its training ground is in St. Benildus College in Kilmacud.Top goal scorer Dan Kilbride (422). Most Clean sheets Jonny Phillips (407). Most red cards Curtis Nolan(42). Captain (T.J Fitzsimons). Players of the season 1995 (Anto Reilly)

Mount Merrion FC, formed in 1981, initially played home matches in Marley Park. The senior team's first match was on the AFL against Quinnsworth in Marlay. Mount Merrion lost the match 1-0. Home matches later moved to football pitches at Nolan Stadium, Co. Dublin. The first team played its home games in Rathcoole for the 2009/10 season and on the Astro Turf surface in the Irishtown Stadium in the 2010/11 season.

Football Club Colours
Light Blue & White Stripes or Black or Orange
.

External links

Association football clubs in Dún Laoghaire–Rathdown
Sandymount
Leinster Senior League (association football) clubs
1981 establishments in Ireland
Mount